Peckoltia otali is a species of catfish in the family Loricariidae. It is native to South America, where it occurs in the upper Maroni basin in French Guiana and Suriname. It is typically found in clear, shallow rapids with a substrate of medium-sized rocks. The species reaches 7.7 cm (3 inches) SL. Its specific epithet, otali, derives from a Wayana word meaning "secret", which refers to both the species' cryptic coloration and the fact that it inhabits areas occupied by the Wayana people.

References 

Fish described in 2012
Ancistrini